The Journal of Music Teacher Education is a peer-reviewed academic journal covering the field of music education. The journal's editor-in-chief is James Austin (University of Colorado Boulder). It was established in 1991 and is currently published by SAGE Publications in association with the National Association for Music Education.

Abstracting and indexing 
The Journal of Music Teacher Education is abstracted and indexed in:
 Academic OneFile
 Current Abstracts
 Education Research Complete
 Expanded Academic ASAP
 TOC Premier
 Wilson Education Index

External links 
 

SAGE Publishing academic journals
English-language journals
Music education journals
Publications established in 1991
Biannual journals